Paliz Khoshdel is an iranian underground film director, editor and producer. He was born in 1986 in Rasht, Iran. From 2009 till now, he continued his career as documentary & experimental filmmaker and producer. His area of concern is mostly on untold stories of Iranian youth generation and their underground lifestyle.

As a director and producer, his films include Street Sultan, Mutiny of Colours. ٫The Makhola Arrives! In 2022, Paliz Khoshdel was present in the competitive part of the festival Busan of South Korea with the long feature documentary "The football aficionado" 

"The football aficionado" co-produced and co-directed by Paliz Khoshdel and Sharmin Mojtahedzadeh, which participated in the competition section of documentary works, won the best Asian documentary film, "BIFF Mecenat Award".

Documentary films

Filmography

As director 

 Street sultans(2010)
 Mutiny of colours(2017)
 The Makhola Arrives ! (2018)
 apnea (2019)
 The football aficionado (2022)

As editor 

 Street sultans(2010)
 Ancient Heritage (2008)
 Asbe Chobi(2011)
 On Underground(2012)
 Better Than life(2013)
 Without Ticket(2016)
 Mutiny of Colours(2017)
 The Makhola Arrives !(2018)
 apnea(2019)
 The football aficionado(2022)
 The Scar (Future film 2023)

As producer 

 Street sultans (Documentary 2010)

 On underground (Documentary 2012)

 Mutiny of Colours (Documentary 2017)

 The Makhola Arrives! (Documentary 2018)

 Apnea (Exprimental 2019)

 The football oficionado (Documentary 2022)

 The Scar (Future film 2023)

National awards
Won “Special Award For The Best Film” from Iranian Critics and Writers Association, 2010
Won “Best Semi-Long Film” Award from Independent “Image of the Year” Festival, 2010
Won “Best Director” Award in Semi-Long Documentary section at “City” International Film Festival, 2011
Won “Best Semi-Long Documentary Film” Award from “Iranian Cinema Ceremony“ at Iranian House Of Cinema 2011.

International awards and screening

Won "BIFF Mecenat Award". Best Documentary in biff Festival 2022
Won “Best Film” Award at Six Weeks of Iranian Art, Canadian Film Festival 2012
Earned “Certificate of Achievement” at Canada's 2nd Iranian Film Festival 2010
Film Screening at Online Women Filmmakers (of Iran) Uppsala Film Festival, Sweden 2012
Film Screening at DHfest film festival in Mexico city, 2014
Film Screening at Cinéma(s) D’Iran 2014
Film Screening at UCLA Celebration of Iranian Cinema, U.S.A 2013
Participated at Media Wave Film Festival, Hungary 2013

References

Further reading

Sport in Iran
Iranian documentary films
Iranian documentary filmmakers
1985 births
Living people